

Background 
The Polar Libraries Colloquy is an international organization of librarians, archivists and others concerned with the collection, preservation, and dissemination of information dealing with the Arctic and Antarctic regions. This organization grew out of the Northern Libraries Colloquy, which first met in Edmonton, Alberta, Canada in June, 1971.

The Colloquy meets biennially, by tradition alternating between Europe and North America. PLC is governed by an international Steering Committee and publishes a newsletter, Polar Libraries Bulletin, as well as Proceedings of the Colloquies. PLC is a member of the University of the Arctic. As a UArctic member, in 2022, PLC initiated a Thematic Network Decolonizing Arctic Library and Archives Metadata (DALAM).

Meetings 
 1st Northern Libraries Colloquy, June 16–17, 1971, Edmonton, Alberta, Canada
 2nd Northern Libraries Colloquy, May 21 - June 2, 1972, Hanover, U.S.A
 3rd Northern Libraries Colloquy, June 25–29, 1973, Cambridge, England
 4th Northern Libraries Colloquy, June 2–6, 1974, Montreal, Quebec, Canada
 5th Northern Libraries Colloquy, May 26–30, 1975, Rovaniemi, Finland
 6th Northern Libraries Colloquy, July 12–15, 1976, Fairbanks, Alaska, U.S.A.
 7th Northern Libraries Colloquy, September 19–23, 1978, Paris, France
 8th Northern Libraries Colloquy, June 1–6, 1980, Edmonton and Whitehorse, Yukon Territory, Canada
 9th Northern Libraries Colloquy, 1982, Tromsø, Norway
 10th Northern Libraries Colloquy, August 12–16, 1984, St. John's, Newfoundland, Canada
 11th Northern Libraries Colloquy, June 9–12, 1986, Luleå, Sweden
 12th Northern Libraries Colloquy, June 5–9, 1988, Boulder, Colorado, U.S.A
 13th Polar Libraries Colloquy, June 10–14, 1990, Rovaniemi, Finland
 14th Polar Libraries Colloquy, May 3–7, 1992, Columbus, Ohio, U.S.A.
 15th Polar Libraries Colloquy, July 3–8, 1994, Cambridge, England
 16th Polar Libraries Colloquy, June 17–22, 1996, Anchorage, Alaska, U.S.A.
 17th Polar Libraries Colloquy, September 20–25, 1998, Reykjavik, Iceland
 18th Polar Libraries Colloquy, June 12–17, 2000, Winnipeg, Manitoba, Canada
 19th Polar Libraries Colloquy, June 17–21, 2002, Copenhagen, Denmark
 20th Polar Libraries Colloquy, June 7–11, 2004, Ottawa, Ontario, Canada
 21st Polar Libraries Colloquy, May 8–12, 2006, Rome, Italy
 22nd Polar Libraries Colloquy, June 2–6, 2008, Edmonton, Canada
 23rd Polar Libraries Colloquy, June 13–18, 2010, Bremerhaven, Germany
 24th Polar Libraries Colloquy, June 11–14, 2012, Boulder, U.S.A.
 25th Polar Libraries Colloquy, June 29 - July 3, 2014 Cambridge, UK
 26th Polar Libraries Colloquy, July 10–15, 2016, Fairbanks, U.S.A.
 27th Polar Libraries Colloquy, June 10–16, 2018, Rovaniemi, Finland
 28th Polar Libraries Colloquy, June 5-11, 2022, Quebec City, Canada

William Mills Prize for Non-Fiction Polar Books 
The William Mills Prize for Non-Fiction Polar Books was established in memory of William Mills (1951 - 2004), who was Librarian and Keeper of Collections at the Scott Polar Research Institute.  The prize was first awarded at the 21st Colloquy in Rome in 2006.

Mills Prize Award Winners 

 2022 Kløver, Geir O. The Nansen Photographs. Oslo: The Fram Museum, 2021
 2020 Demuth, Bathsheba. Floating Coast: An Environmental History of the Bering Strait. New York: W.W. Norton, 2019
 2018 Fitzhugh, William W. and Martin T. Nweeia, eds. Narwhal: Revealing an Arctic Legend. Montreal and Hanover, NH: International Polar Institute; and Washington, DC: Arctic Studies Center, 2017.
 2016 Bown, Stephen. White Eskimo: Knud Rasmussen’s Fearless Journey into the Heart of the Arctic. Boston: Merloyd Lawrence Books, Da Capo Press, 2015.
 2014 Fox Gearheard, Shari, Lene Kielsen Holm, Henry Huntington, Joe Mello Leavitt, Andrew R. Mahoney, Margaret Opie, Toku Oshima and Joelie Sanguya, eds. The Meaning of Ice: People and Sea Ice in Three Arctic Communities. Hanover, NH: International Polar Institute Press, 2013.
 2012 Kobalenko, Jerry. Arctic Eden: Journeys through the Changing High Arctic.Vancouver: Greystone Books: David Suzuiki Foundation, 2010.
 2010 Bockstoce, John R. Furs and Frontiers in the Far North. New Haven, CT: Yale University Press, 2009.
 2008 Riffenburgh, Beau, ed. Encyclopedia of the Antarctic. New York, London: Routledge, 2007.
 2006 Nuttall, Mark, ed. Encyclopedia of the Arctic. New York: Routledge, 2005.

Hubert Wenger Award 
An award designed award is to provide financial assistance to one or more delegates who might otherwise be unable to attend a PLC biennial meeting. Named in honor of Hubert Wenger.  Wenger and his wife, Beatrice, were long-standing members of PLC.

History 
The history of the Northern Libraries Colloquy was described by Geraldine Cooke in 1974 Later history of the Polar Libraries Colloquy was described by Andrews and Corley-Murchison

References

External links
 Website

Library associations
Polar regions of the Earth